40S ribosomal protein S16''' is a protein that in humans is encoded by the RPS16'' gene.

Ribosomes, the organelles that catalyze protein synthesis, consist of a small 40S subunit and a large 60S subunit. Together these subunits are composed of 4 RNA species and approximately 80 structurally distinct proteins. This gene encodes a ribosomal protein that is a component of the 40S subunit. The protein belongs to the S9P family of ribosomal proteins. It is located in the cytoplasm. As is typical for genes encoding ribosomal proteins, there are multiple processed pseudogenes of this gene dispersed through the genome.

Interactions
Ribosomal protein S16 is one of the proteins from the small ribosomal subunit. It belongs to a ribosomal protein family that is divided into three groups based on sequence similarity:

* Eubacterial S16.

* Algal and plant chloroplast S16.

* Cyanelle S16.

* Neurospora crassa mitochondrial S24 (cyt-21).

S16 proteins have about 100 amino-acid residues. There are two paralogues in Arabidopsis thaliana, RPS16-1 (chloroplastic) and RPS16-2 (targeted to the chloroplast and the mitochondrion) 

[4].

RPS16 has been shown to interact with CDC5L.

References

Further reading

Ribosomal proteins